

Rifle Company Butterworth is an Australian Army infantry company based at RMAF Base Butterworth in Butterworth, Penang, Malaysia. Rifle Company Butterworth was established in 1970 to provide a protective and quick-reaction force for RAAF Base Butterworth during a resurgence of the Communist insurgency in Malaysia. While RAAF Base Butterworth was handed to the Royal Malaysian Air Force in 1988 and the insurgency officially ended in 1989, Rifle Company Butterworth has been maintained as a means of providing Australian soldiers with training in jungle warfare and cross-training with the Malaysian Army. The company is staffed on a rotational basis, with both Regular and Reserve personnel being deployed quarterly.

See also
Communist insurgency in Malaysia (1968–89)
Malayan Emergency (1948–1960)
Sarawak Communist Insurgency
Operation Gateway

Notes

References

External links
 Recognition Of RCB Service - RCB Review Group Recognition Of RCB Service Website

 Royal Australian Regiment Society of South Australia Appeal for AASM Entitlements For Military Service as Rifle Company Butterworth In Malaysia 1970–1989

Infantry units and formations of Australia
Military units and formations established in 1973
Australia–Malaysia relations